XLI Brigade, Royal Field Artillery was a brigade of the Royal Field Artillery which served in the First World War. 

It was originally formed with 9th, 16th and 17th Batteries, and attached to 2nd Infantry Division.  In August 1914 it mobilised and was sent to the Continent with the British Expeditionary Force, where it saw service with 2nd Division until the end of the war. 47th (Howitzer) Battery joined the brigade in May 1916.
It took part in most of the major actions, including:
1914 - The Battle of Mons and the subsequent retreat, including the Affair of Landrecies, the Rearguard affair of Le Grand Fayt and the Rearguard actions of Villers-Cotterets; The Battle of the Marne; The Battle of the Aisne; First Battle of Ypres
1915 - The Battle of Festubert; The Battle of Loos
1916 - The Battle of Delville Wood; The Battle of the Ancre.  
After the end of the Battle of the Somme in December 1916, the artillery was reorganised, and often deployed to support different Divisions depending on need.  For example, for the Battle of Vimy Ridge (9 to 12 April 1917), part of the opening phase of the British-led Battle of Arras, 2nd Divisional Artillery, including 41st Brigade, operated in support of 4th Canadian Division, which was responsible for the northern portion of the advance which included the capture of the highest point of the ridge followed by the heavily defended knoll known as "the Pimple" just north of the town of Givenchy-en-Gohelle.

It went to France with the following officers (see WO95/1313) and senior NCOs:- Brigade HQ: Lt-Col Stephen  Lushington, Adjutant: Capt F Brousson; Orderly Officer: Lt Otto M Lund; Medical Officer: Capt T S Blackwell RAMC; Vet Officer: Lt G Williamson RAVC. The RSM was Samuel E James (81063).
9th Battery: Major R D Wylde; Capt Henry Charles Rochfort-Boyd [dow 4/12/1917];Lt D D Rose; Lt N H Huttenbach; 2Lt H Price-Williams; BSM Albert Charles Hanks(84198); BQMS Arthur Charles Thorpe(16627)
16th Battery: Major H F E Lewin;Capt C R B Carrington; Lt S Atkinson;Lt H O C Anne; 2Lt G Messervy;BSM W Little (1745); BQMS William  Kinsella (18552) 
17th Battery: Major H H Bond; Captain H H Joll; Lt D C Stephenson; Lt C T Carfrae; 2Lt R T W Glynn; BSM Alfred John Wark (4838);BQMS W H K Hinton (33512)	
41st Brigade Ammunition Column: Capt. G. St.L. Thornton; Lt H G Lee-Warner; 2Lt J R Cleland; BSM H Lowe (26703). 
Of these, the last of the original officers still serving with the 41st Brigade, Captain (acting Major) Gerald Messervy MC, was killed 9 October 1918, commanding 16th Battery.

External links
Royal Field Artillery Brigades
2nd Division Order of Battle
War Diary Commander Royal Artillery 2nd Division

Notes

References

Royal Field Artillery brigades
Artillery units and formations of World War I